Suliskongen is a mountain in the municipality of Fauske in Nordland, Norway. The Sulitjelma Glacier lies on the mountain.

References

Mountains of Nordland
Fauske